The Travel Industry Council of Ontario (TICO) is a non-profit organization responsible for administering and enforcing the Ontario Travel Industry Act on behalf of the Ontario government. The legislation governs all travel retailers and wholesalers registered in Ontario. TICO covers residents outside of Ontario when they book with TICO-registered organizations.

References 

Organizations based in Ontario